The men's foil was one of eight fencing events on the fencing at the 1980 Summer Olympics programme. It was the eighteenth appearance of the event. The competition was held from 22 to 23 July 1980. 37 fencers from 16 nations competed. Nations had been limited to three fencers each since 1928. The event was won by Vladimir Smirnov of the Soviet Union, the nation's first victory in the men's foil since 1960 and second overall. His countryman Alexandr Romankov took bronze, becoming the eighth man to win multiple medals in the event. It was the first time in five Games that France did not receive the bronze medal—though Pascal Jolyot earned silver instead.

Background

This was the 18th appearance of the event, which has been held at every Summer Olympics except 1908 (when there was a foil display only rather than a medal event). Three of the six finalists from 1976 returned: silver medalist Aleksandr Romankov of the Soviet Union, fifth-place finisher Frédéric Pietruszka of France, and sixth-place finisher Greg Benko of Australia. The American-led boycott had little effect on the favorites, with top foil fencing nations France, Italy, the Soviet Union, Romania, and Hungary all competing. Romankov was the favorite, having won the 1974, 1977, and 1979 world championships. France presented the strongest challengers to him, with Didier Flament, the 1978 world champion, and Pascal Jolyot, the 1979 world runner-up.

Algeria made its debut in the men's foil. France made its 16th appearance, matching the United States for most of any nation; France had missed only the 1904 (with fencers not traveling to St. Louis) and the 1912 (boycotted due to a dispute over rules) foil competitions.

Competition format

The 1980 tournament continued to use a mix of pool and knockout rounds. The competition included two pool rounds, followed by a double-elimination knockout round, finishing with a final pool round. In each pool round, the fencers competed in a round-robin.

Bouts in the round-robin pools were to 5 touches; bouts in the double-elimination round were to 10 touches. Repechages were not used in the first two rounds, but were used to determine medalists if necessary in the final.

Schedule

All times are Moscow Time (UTC+3)

Results

Round 1

Round 1 Pool A

Round 1 Pool B

Round 1 Pool C

Round 1 Pool D

Round 1 Pool E

Round 1 Pool F

Round 1 Pool G

Round 1 Pool H

Round 2

Round 2 Pool A

Round 2 Pool B

Round 2 Pool C

Round 2 Pool D

Double elimination rounds

Winners brackets

Winners group 1

Winners group 2

Winners group 3

Winners group 4

Losers brackets

Losers group 1

Losers group 2

Final round 

 Barrage

Final classification

References

Foil men
Men's events at the 1980 Summer Olympics